The W-3 Bantam is a simple single place, homebuilt aircraft design from Bill Warwick of Torrance, California.

Design
The W-3 is a single place tricycle gear,  low wing aircraft with an open cockpit or bubble canopy. Construction is all metal with a welded-steel-tube forward fuselage with attachment points for the wing spars and engine mount. The fuselage uses non-compound curves and features a square vertical stabilizer

Operational history
The prototype was featured on the cover of the May 1972 issue of Popular Mechanics.

Specifications (W-3 Bantam)

References

Homebuilt aircraft